Guthridge is an unincorporated community in Chariton County, in the U.S. state of Missouri.

History
Guthridge was originally called Guthridge Mills, and under the latter name was laid out in 1858, and named after James Guthridge, the proprietor of a local mill.  A post office called Guthridges Mills was established in 1879, and remained in operation until 1906.

References

Unincorporated communities in Chariton County, Missouri
Unincorporated communities in Missouri